The 1981 Texas Longhorns football team represented the University of Texas at Austin in the 1981 NCAA Division I-A football season.  The Longhorns finished the regular season with a 9–1–1 record and defeated Alabama in the 1982 Cotton Bowl Classic.

Schedule

Personnel

Season summary

Rice

North Texas State

Miami (FL)

vs. Oklahoma

at Arkansas

at SMU

Texas Tech

at Houston

TCU

Baylor

Source: Eugene Register-Guard

at Texas A&M

Cotton Bowl (vs. Alabama)

References

Texas
Texas Longhorns football seasons
Cotton Bowl Classic champion seasons
Texas Longhorns football